Manchu Lakshmi Prasanna (born 8 October 1977) is an Indian actress, producer, and television presenter who works in Telugu cinema and worked in American television. The daughter of actor Mohan Babu, Manchu holds a bachelor's degree in Theatre from Oklahoma City University. She has garnered the SIIMA Award, two Filmfare Awards South, and two State Nandi Awards.

Manchu made her acting debut with the American television series Las Vegas, where she played the minor role of Sarasvati Kumar, the love interest of James Lesure. She then appeared in one episode of each of the following series: Desperate Housewives, Late Nights with my Lover and Mystery ER. She has also appeared in commercials for Toyota, AARP and Chevrolet. 

In 2006, she directed, produced and acted in Perfect Lives, a short film that was showcased at the Wilshire Fine Arts Theater as part of the  La Femme Film Festival in Los Angeles. She made her Theatre debut as Miss Trunchbull in the adaptation of Roald Dahl's Matilda, directed by Taher Ali Baig in 2016.

Early life and family
Lakshmi Manchu is the only daughter of actor Mohan Babu and Vidya Devi. She has two brothers Vishnu Manchu and Manoj Manchu. She was born in Chennai and can speak Tamil, Telugu, and English.  

Manchu married Andy Srinivasan, an IT professional from Chennai in 2006. The couple has a daughter born through surrogacy. They are settled in Hyderabad.

Career
Having started her career at the age of 4, Manchu has been in 20 feature films in India and few minor television roles in the U.S. She co-owns Sree Lakshmi Prasanna Pictures along with her family members, a production company that has produced fifty-six feature films to date.

In December 2011, she was signed on to portray a supporting role in Mani Ratnam's Tamil film Kadal after a successful audition. Portraying the role of Celina, a poor village woman, she expected this film to be her breakthrough but hardly got offers in Tamil after the film's release.

Filmography

Film

Acting roles

Producer

Television

Acting roles

As a host or judge

Awards and nominations

References

External links
Official website

Living people
Indian film actresses
Indian women television presenters
Indian television presenters
Television personalities from Andhra Pradesh
Actresses in Telugu cinema
Actresses in Telugu television
Actresses in Malayalam cinema
21st-century Indian actresses
Oklahoma City University alumni
Indian emigrants to the United States
Nandi Award winners
Indian women film producers
Film producers from Andhra Pradesh
People from Chittoor district
Actresses in Tamil cinema
Filmfare Awards South winners
Businesswomen from Andhra Pradesh
1977 births
South Indian International Movie Awards winners